Acilius sulcatus is a species of water beetle in family Dytiscidae.It is fairly large (14.4 – 18.2 mm), with color variation shown throughout its range. Typically it is yellow and black.

Range
A. sulcatus has a worldwide distribution but is found primarily in North Western Europe.

Taxonomy
A. sulcatus is known throughout Europe as the lesser diving beetle, a common name shared with many other aquatic beetles in the family Dytiscidae.

Habitat
Temporary and permanent water bodies. A.sulcatas shows a generalist response to habitat choice living in bogs, ponds, streams, etc. As A. sulcatus is able to fly it is not restricted to a single body of water. A. sulcatus is found in water bodies with high and low levels of vegetation showing no preference between the two. They dominate in water bodies without any fish predators and are used as a primary indicator of predator presence.

Environmental pressures
A. sulcatus is a found over a large range and is not thought to face any pressures on the continuity of the species, as such the beetle has not been evaluated by the IUCN. A unique morph is, however, recognized in the Akfadou mountains of Algeria, and has the potential of attaining separate species status. Habitat loss due to logging and allopatric separation from other populations means that the morph deserves special attention. Due to its fairly large distribution A. sulcatus population numbers have been used as an aid in the measurement of the ecological health of wetlands.

Life cycle
A. sulcatus is univoltine with adults overwintering in deep permanent water bodies that neither dry out or freeze completely. Mating pairs are found in both spring and autumn. Females lay their eggs near water on the underside of plant matter. Eggs hatch after about 1 week. Larval development takes about 30 days and pupal development takes another 16–28 days.

Feeding
A. sulcatus is a predatory diving beetle which feeds upon small invertebrate and vertebrate prey. Larvae prefer micro-invertebrate prey such as Daphnia, whereas adults select size appropriate prey. Known for its high aquatic speed A. sulcatus actively pursues prey rather than using a sit and wait ambush strategy seen in other arthropods. A. sulcatus is active both day and night. A. sulcatus larvae capture prey headfirst, with their mandibles before injecting digestive enzymes, for extra oral digestion. Adults do not use extra oral digestion, instead using their strong mouth parts to devour prey.

Morphology
Color varies throughout the range of A. sulcatus and is not a good identifying characteristic, however; A. sulcatus shows many unique structural morphologies useful for identification. A. sulcatus is easily recognized by its large distinctive hind legs. The hind legs are long and fringed with setae, forming a paddle like shape when spread. The body is always wider than the height of the insect, and is streamlined (no spines, or other chitinous structures protruding). As in all Dytiscidae beetles the sternal keel is absent. A. sulcatus is clumsy on land, but it is well adapted for an aquatic lifestyle and is a strong flier. A. sulcatus may also be recognized by unique reproductive structures. Males have 3 ventral suction disks used to secure the male to the slippery female during reproduction. Male attachment to females is detrimental to female survival as the mating period may attract predators. To avoid potential mating costs (her life) females show modifications of the elytra. The elytra is highly grooved with many suberect setae, making male attachment far more difficult. The male elytra is smooth without setae showing high levels of sexual dimorphism. The competition between the sexes has led to an evolutionary sexual arms race.

Defensive strategy
Aquatic beetles in family Dytiscidae possess defensive glands, used to secrete agents repellent and toxic to vertebrate predators. Secretions primarily contain steroids synthesized from cholesterol. The steroids secreted act to anesthetize predators, leading to narcosis. The steroids produced vary in levels of toxicity depending on food availability and photoperiod. A. sulcatus is highly adapted for aquatic movement and can make effective us of its speed to escape threats. When tested against 72 other common water beetle species A. sulcatus was shown to have the highest movement velocity. During the day A. sulcatus uses primarily visual information to avoid predators; however in low light conditions chemical signals are used as the dominant cues for avoidance.). It has also been suggested that a 'humming' sound, produced by an interaction of the wings and the elytra, is used as a defensive strategy by causing an unpleasant vibrating sensation in the mouth of a predator.

Bio-control
Although it has not been put into practice, laboratory tests have shown A. sulcatus to be a highly effective predator of mosquito larvae. As such its use as an environmentally friendly bio-control device is being examined.

Gallery

Further reading

Abjornsson, K., Wagner, B. M. A., Axelsson, A., Bjerselius, R. & Olse¨n, K. H. 1997 Responses of Acilius sulcatus (Coleoptera: Dytiscidae) to chemical cues from perch (Perca fluviatilis). Oecologia. 111: 166–171.

Bergstein, J. 2005. Taxonomy, phylogeny, and secondary sexual character evolution of diving beetles, focusing on the genus Acilius. Umea University Print and Media. 6- 32

Bergsten, J., K.B., Miller. 2005. Taxonomic revision of the Holarctic diving beetle genus Acilius Leach (Coleoptera: Dytiscidae). Systematic Entomology. 31: 145–197.

Cayrou J., and R. Cereghino. 2005. Life cycle phenology of some aquatic insects: implications for pond conservation. Aquatic Conservation: Marine and Freshwater Ecosystems. 15: 559–571

Chandra, G., S. K.,Mandel, Ghosh, A. K., Das, D., S. S., Banergee, Chakraborty, S .2008. Biocontrol of larval mosquitoes by Acilius sulcatus (Coleoptera: Dytiscidae). BMC Infectious Diseases. 8: 138

Fescemyer, H.W., and R.O., Mumma.1983. Regeneration and Biosynthesis of Dytisci Defensive Agents (Coleoptera: Dytiscidae). Journal of Chemical Ecology 9(11): 1149–1464

IUCN (International Union For Conservation Of Nature) (accessed 2012,09,05). http://www.iucn.org/ information on species distribution and ecological standing

Marshal, J.N., and Diebel, C. (1995). 'Deep-Sea Spiders' That Walk through The Water. The Journal of Experimental Biology. 198:1371–1379.

Miller, J.R., R.O., Mumma. (1975). Physiological Activity Of Water Beetle Defensive Agents. I. Toxicity And Anesthetic Activity Of Steroids And Norsesquiterpenes Administered In Solution To The Minnow. Journal of Chemical Ecology 2(2): 115- 130.

Nilson, A.N., I., Ribera (1995). Morphometric Patterns Among Diving Beetles (Coleoptera: Noteridae, Hygrobiidae, and Dyscidae). Canadian Journal of Zoology. 73: 2343- 2360.

Swevers, J., J., Lambert, J.G.D., and de Loof (1991). Synthesis and Metabolism of Vertebrate-type Steroids by Tissues of Insects a Critical Evaluation. Experientia'' 47''': 687–698

References

Fauna europaea
Biolib

Dytiscidae
Beetles of Europe
Beetles described in 1758
Taxa named by Carl Linnaeus